"My Man" is a R&B and soul song recorded by American singer Tamar Braxton for her fifth studio album Bluebird of Happiness (2017). Braxton and Cory Rooney wrote the song, which was produced by Bob Robinson Jr. It was released for digital download and streaming on April 27, 2017 as the album's lead single. "My Man" was the first single from Braxton's independent record label, Tamartian Land, created with the support of eOne Entertainment.

The lyrics are about infidelity, which were based on Braxton's parents and their divorce after her father's affair. Braxton wrote the song from her mother's perspective on the relationship. Describing "My Man" as her most personal song, she also used one of her past relationships as inspiration.

The song was well received by music critics. It peaked at number three and twenty-one on Billboard Adult R&B Songs and Hot R&B Songs component charts, respectively. "My Man" was promoted on an episode of the reality television series Braxton Family Values and through live performances. Braxton's performance at the BET Awards 2017 was praised as one of the event's highlights, although some critics believed she was lip syncing. An accompanying video, released on June 25, 2017, features Braxton confronting her lover and his mistress in a hotel room.

Background and release 

Tamar Braxton co-wrote "My Man" with Cory Rooney for her fifth studio album Bluebird of Happiness (2017). The song was produced by Bob Robinson Jr., who worked with Braxton on her eponymous debut album (2000). Braxton based "My Man" on her parents' marriage and their divorce following her father's infidelity. While developing the lyrics, she imagined her mother's perspective to convey her emotions "as a woman and not just as [a] mom". Additional inspiration came from one of Braxton's past relationships that caused her to question her self-worth. According to Braxton, the single was written and recorded quickly; she explained that it "just rolled out of me". She identified "My Man" as her most personal song, and said the single and overall album was "the first time you see an X-ray vision of Tamar and everything I've been through".

Prior to the song's release, Braxton had played it for her father, whom she told that she had forgiven for his past affair. He was initially flattered that she wrote a song about him, although he did not pay attention to the lyrics. "My Man" premiered on an episode of the reality television series Braxton Family Values in late April 2017. In Entertainment Tonight, Latifah Muhammad said Braxton's frank discussion about her parents' divorce and her current relationship with them showed how the Braxton family include "some tough moments on camera for their reality show".

Braxton released "My Man" on April 27, 2017 as the album's lead single for digital download and streaming. The single was sent to urban radio stations on July 18, 2017. It was the only song on Bluebird of Happiness to be marked for explicit content. "My Man" was the first song from Braxton's independent record label, which she created in partnership with eOne Entertainment. She left Epic Records, which released three of her albums, to have more control over her career. When discussing this switch, Braxton said she was happy about not having to "sell people on things that I want to do". For the release of "My Man", Braxton named her label Tamartian Land, a reference to her fans' nickname as "Tamartians". The name changed to Logan Land for Bluebird of Happiness as a reference to her son, Logan.

Music and lyrics 

"My Man" is a four-minute, 11-second R&B and soul ballad, performed in the style of a slow jam and a torch song. In an Uproxx article, Elias Leight cited the single as an example of how R&B music uses "updates of the Southern soul sound", and while writing for Rolling Stone, he said it "draws on a long line of fraught, theatrical soul ballads". The instrumental includes a piano and an electric guitar. SoulBounce's D-Money described "My Man" as having a "slow R&B groove". Critics described its overall tone as sad, especially when compared to the more upbeat composition of the promotional single "Pick Me Up".

The song's lyrics are about infidelity; Mikael Wood of the Los Angeles Times said its central message was "never trust a lonely woman with the one you love". Vibe's Da’Shan Smith described the lyrics as "suspiciously auto-biographical" for Braxton. The chorus, "I don't want to hear no bullshit stories about my man, I just can't believe that you're with her / I just can't believe she stole my man", refers to an affair. D-Money interpreted these lyrics as being about  the "initial denial and eventual acceptance that her man has been stolen by another woman". While discussing the song's first verse, SoulTracks''' Justin Kantor compared Tamar's voice to the "rich low alto" of her sister Toni Braxton. Kantor described Braxton as "belting grittily on the higher end of the scale" for the lyrics, “Is this my life? It cuts me like a knife”.

 Reception 

"My Man" received a positive response from music critics. Justin Kantor commended Braxton for conveying the song's varying emotions. AllMusic's Andy Kellman selected "My Man" as a highlight from Bluebird of Happiness,  writing that album "crest[ed] with the two-timed belter" and its final track "Empty Boxes". In an article about the 60th Annual Grammy Awards nominations, Da’Shan Smith said "My Man" was snubbed.

"My Man" peaked at number three on the Adult R&B Songs Billboard chart for the week of August 19, 2017, and stayed on the chart for 22 weeks. The song also reached number 21 on the Hot R&B Songs Billboard chart for the week of August 26, 2017. According to the Houston Chronicle, the single was successful on adult R&B stations. However, Elias Leight said while songs like "My Man" are popular on R&B radio, they are never able to crossover to be played on pop radio or in feature films.

 Music video and live performances 
The music video for "My Man" was released on June 25, 2017. Filmed in black and white, it depicts Braxton confronting her lover and his mistress over his infidelity. After finding her lover's hotel room, Braxton sees him in bed with another woman. She pushes the mistress to the bathroom floor before confronting him, taking back her coat, and leaving the hotel. A writer from Rap-Up believed a future music video would continue the story. A portion of "Blind", the second single from Bluebird of Happiness, was included at the end of the video.

Braxton performed "My Man" on the BET Awards 2017 while accompanied by a group of back-up dancers. These performers were four sets of couples, who were interrupted by the arrival of the men's mistresses. Braxton was also accompanied by a band, but she performed the song without backing vocalists. Critics praised the performance as one of the award show's highlights. Mikael Wood and D-Money said that it added energy to the event, which was criticized as having technical and pacing issues. Describing Braxton as a "glorious drama queen", Elias Leight enjoyed her "series of well-honed, highly dramatic gestures"; he wrote that "the force of her stagecraft" kept the attention on her rather than the dancers. In an article for Billboard, Dan Rys praised Braxton's vocals, and highlighted her mic drop as a "fitting exclamation point" to the performance.

Despite this positive response, Twitter users believed Braxton was lip-syncing; Michael Arceneaux also thought this, and jokingly asked why she kept "aggressively moving her wig like it was dipped in a fire ant bed before she glued it to her head". In response to these reports, Braxton uploaded an Instagram video in which she was rehearsing the song a cappella prior to the BET performance. During an appearance on the game show Hip Hop Squares, Braxton had an argument with host DeRay Davis when he joked that she had lip-synced for the BET performance. Lil Mama, one of the episode's celebrity contestants, had informed Braxton about the joke since she did not hear it the first time. In an interview with the radio show The Breakfast Club, Braxton said she is close friends with Davis, and added that Lil Mama "needs the spirit of the hush sometimes".

 Track listings 

 Credits and personnel 
Credits adapted from the liner notes of Bluebird of Happiness''.

 Songwriting – Tamar Braxton, Cory Rooney
 Production – Bob Robinson Jr.

Charts

Release history

References

Footnotes

Citations 

 
 
 
 
 
 
 
 
 
 
 
 
 
 
 
 
 
 
 
 
 
 
 
 
 
 
 
 
 
 
 
 
 
 
 
 
 
 
 
 
 
 
 
 

2010s ballads
2017 singles
2017 songs
Contemporary R&B ballads
Songs about heartache
Songs about infidelity
Songs written by Cory Rooney
Songs written by Tamar Braxton
Soul ballads
Tamar Braxton songs
Torch songs